SN-38 is an antineoplastic drug. It is the active metabolite of irinotecan (an analog of camptothecin - a topoisomerase I inhibitor) but has 1000 times more activity than irinotecan itself. In vitro cytotoxicity assays show that the potency of SN-38 relative to irinotecan varies from 2- to 2000-fold.

SN38 is formed via hydrolysis of irinotecan by carboxylesterases and metabolized via glucuronidation by UGT1A1.

The variant of UGT1A1 in ~10% of Caucasians which leads to poor metabolism of SN-38 predicts irinotecan toxicity, as it is then less easily excreted from the body in its SN-38 glucuronide form.

SN-38 and its glucuronide are lost into the bile and intestines.  It can cause the symptoms of diarrhoea and myelosuppression experienced by ~25% of the patients administered irinotecan.

Interactive pathway map

See also
NK012, a nanodevice formulation of SN-38
Sacituzumab govitecan, an antibody-drug conjugate that uses SN-38 as the cytotoxic drug.

References

Topoisomerase inhibitors